Lac de Pérolles, a reservoir formed by Maigrauge Dam, is a reservoir on the Saane/Sarine river at Fribourg, in western Switzerland. The Maigrauge Dam has a gated spillway.

References

External links
Réserve naturelle du lac de Pérolles 

Perolles
Fribourg
Perolles
RLacdePerolles